Greenton is an unincorporated community in Lafayette County, in the U.S. state of Missouri.

History
Greenton was laid out in 1835 by Joseph Green, and named for him. A post office called Greenton was established in 1839, and remained in operation until 1902.

References

Unincorporated communities in Lafayette County, Missouri
Unincorporated communities in Missouri